The Computer Science High School of Bicolandia, also referred to by its acronym CSHSB, is an information and communications technology (ICT) and junior high school in the capital town of Pili, Camarines Sur, Philippines. 

Founded in 2008, it is a previously university-administered high school under the Central Bicol State University of Agriculture until 2015. At present, the school operates under the Department of Education with a specialized curriculum for ICT.

History 

The Computer Science High School of Bicolandia (CSHSB) was founded in 2008. The establishment was by way of R.A. No. 10284 in the Congress of the Philippines. It was initially named as "Bicolandia ICT-Oriented High School". A few months later after its foundation, the name of the school had been changed to its current name.

This special program was initiated by the actions of then Congressman of the Third District of Camarines Sur, Luis R. Villafuerte, in collaboration with Central Bicol State University of Agriculture, under the administration of its first University President, Atty. Marito T. Bernales.

Through the help of the late Mayor Alexis San Luis, top elementary graduate students across the capital town of Pili, Camarines Sur were invited to take the school's first entrance examination in 2008. The original intake was supposedly the top 70 students of the entrance examination and interview until it was decided to add another two slots as approved by the school's administration.

The 72 students were known as part of the pioneer batch of CSHSB. They were the first recipients of free education and other educational benefits as sponsored by the then congressman. The first sections of the school were named as I-Unity and I-Harmony. It was in 2009 when the current CSHSB Building had been used and also the start of using the “A” and “P” sections. The school has two or three sections per year level ever since its establishment.

The school is a university-administered high school for seven years. It was initially administered from the Institute of Arts and Sciences (now the College of Arts and Sciences), until it was later transferred to the College of Development Education. During the school year 2011-2012, the levels were completed from first year to fourth year. It was in 2012 when the CSHSB produced its very own pioneer graduates.

In 2015, the administration of the school marked its start under the Department of Education, which is formerly with its home university Central Bicol State University of Agriculture. With the implementation of the K to 12 Basic Education Program by the Aquino Administration, the school completely operated as a junior high school starting the school year 2015-2016.

Classes

Admissions 
At present, CSHSB is a popular school of choice among elementary graduates from the town of Pili and the rest of Camarines Sur. The school requires passing an entrance examination followed by an interview for all prospective students. The top applicants will comprise the sections of Grade 7 which are the 7-Symbian, 7-Oracle, and 7-Android.

Sections 
Except for Grade 10 which has two (2) sections, the other grade levels have three (3) sections each. The current names of each section for all grade levels are listed below.

Curriculum
The school's specialized ICT curriculum provides technical know-how on Computer Programming, Computer Animation, Computer Networking, Computer Troubleshooting, Web Development and other Computer Courses, for its Grade 7 up to Grade 10 students. It has two air-conditioned Computer laboratories kept with 1:1 student-computer ratio.

Along with the said specialized subject offerings, subjects like English, Math, Science, Filipino, Social Studies, Values Education, and MAPEH (Music, Arts, Physical Education and Health) are also offered for Grades 7 to 10. On the other hand, subjects like Technical Writing and Statistics, and advance lessons in Mathematics and Science are being taught in Grade 8 level while Research is offered for Grade 8 and Grade 9 students.

Meanwhile, additional skills like culinary, driving, swimming, and music will also be integrated to some related subjects.

References

External links

Facebook page
Blogspot page for CSHSB  
Republic Act No. 10284

High schools in Camarines Sur
Educational institutions established in 2008
2008 establishments in the Philippines
Science high schools in the Philippines
Information technology schools